The Plaza on DeWitt was completed in 1966 as a residential apartment building at 260 E. Chestnut Street in the Streeterville neighborhood of Chicago. Originally called the DeWitt-Chestnut Apartment Building, and designed by Bangladeshi-Pakistani engineer Fazlur Rahman Khan while he was working for Skidmore, Owings & Merrill, it was the first building in the world to implement the tubular construction method later used for the World Trade Center. The 43-story tower accommodates 407 residences and is the tallest building in Chicago to be clad in travertine marble. It was converted to condominiums in 1975. On the ground floor, a French bistro, Le Petit Paris, formerly Zaven's, serves traditional French cuisine.

In 2002, a fire on the 14th floor killed one and injured 11, and on December 10, 2009 another fire, on the 36th floor, also killed one person and injured 12 people. About one third of the Chicago Fire Department's equipment, with about 300 firefighters, responded to the 2009 fire.

External links
Official Plaza on DeWitt Site
Emporis.com

References 

Bangladeshi inventions
Residential skyscrapers in Chicago
Residential condominiums in Chicago
Skidmore, Owings & Merrill buildings
1966 establishments in Illinois
Residential buildings completed in 1966
Fazlur Khan buildings